Petiolaris  is a Latin name often found in taxonomy to refer to a petiole or leaf stalk.:

Species Latin names abbreviations

 F. petiolaris
 Ficus petiolaris, a species in the genus Ficus

Varieties
 the sundew "petiolaris complex", a group in the genus Drosera, containing tropical Australian species which live in constantly warm but irregularly wet conditions
 Senna artemisioides ssp. petiolaris, Randell, the woody cassia
 Tilia × petiolaris, a variety in the genus Tilia

See also
 Drosera dilatato-petiolaris, a plant species in the genus Drosera